Active Stealth is a 1999 American action film directed by Fred Olen Ray and starring Daniel Baldwin, Paul Michael Robinson, Joe Lala and Tim Abell.

Premise
Captain Murphy (Daniel Baldwin), an American fighter pilot, is sent on a mission to Mexico by his commanding officer General Reynolds (Fred Williamson) to combat drug dealer Salvatore (Joe Lala) and free hostages he holds. Murphy uses an airplane with experimental stealth technology. When he arrives, Murphy finds he has been set up and the plan is to give Salvatore the new plane.

Reception
The film received poor reviews. Radio Times scored it 1/5. TV Guide scored it 2/5, finding it predictable though praising the action scenes and aerial photography. Apollo Guide rated it 25/100, criticising the slow pace and lack of plot, though noting that the makers at least had the decency to let it go straight to video. Prisma also rated it 2/5.

References

External links
Active Stealth at TCMDB

1999 films
American action films
1990s English-language films
Films directed by Fred Olen Ray
1990s American films